The Pondo rock gecko or Pondo flat gecko (Afroedura pondolia) is a species of African gecko found in South Africa and Eswatini.

References

pondolia
Reptiles described in 1925
Reptiles of Eswatini
Reptiles of South Africa
Taxa named by John Hewitt (herpetologist)